José Luis Martínez Ocaña (born 10 September 1968) is a Spanish weightlifter. He competed at the 1988 Summer Olympics and the 1992 Summer Olympics.

References

External links
 
 
 
 

1968 births
Living people
Spanish male weightlifters
Olympic weightlifters of Spain
Weightlifters at the 1988 Summer Olympics
Weightlifters at the 1992 Summer Olympics
Sportspeople from Girona
20th-century Spanish people